The Mekhrenga is a river in Plesetsky and Kholmogorsky Districts and in the town of Mirny of Arkhangelsk Oblast in Russia. It is a left tributary of the Yemtsa. The principal tributaries of the Mekhrenga are the Shorda (left), the Myagdoma (right), and the Puksa (left).

The Mekhrenga is the biggest tributary of the Yemtsa, and is actually longer than the Yemtsa. Its river basin covers the northern part of the Nyandomsky District, the south-eastern part of the Plesetsky District, and the southern part of the Kholmogorsky District.

The source of the Mekhrenga is in the south of the Plesetsky District, close to the border with the Nyandomsly District, several kilometers to the west of the village of Saltozero. It flows east, passes two lakes (Lake Ora and Lake Chyolmus) and then turns north. Downstream from the lakes, the valley of the Mekhrenga is populated, except for the stretch of the river within the town limits of Mirny. The mouth of the Mekhrenga is located in the village of Ust-Mekhrenga.

References

External links 
 

Rivers of Arkhangelsk Oblast